Benjamin Lock and Yuta Shimizu won the second of the series of three events that comprised the Nonthaburi Challenger, but chose to defend their title with different partners. Lock partnered his brother Courtney but lost in the quarterfinals to Francis Alcantara and Christopher Rungkat. Shimizu partnered Anirudh Chandrasekar but lost in the semifinals to Alcantara and Rungkat.

Chung Yun-seong and Ajeet Rai won the title after defeating Alcantara and Rungkat 6–1, 7–6(8–6) in the final.

Seeds

Draw

References

External links
 Main draw

Nonthaburi Challenger III - Doubles